The Qatar men's national 3x3 team represents the country in international 3x3 basketball (3 against 3) competitions. It is administrated by the Qatar Basketball Federation. 

In 2014, Qatar were the reigning 3x3 basketball World Champions as well as the Champion of Asia. The team also won the 2013, 2014 and 2015 editions of the GCC 3x3 Basketball Championships.

Performance at Asian Games

See also 
 Qatar men's national basketball team
 Qatar women's national basketball team
 Qatar men's national under-19 basketball team
 Qatar men's national under-16 basketball team

External links
Qatar Basketball Federation

References 

Men's national 3x3 basketball teams
Basketball in Qatar